William Bell Dinsmoor Jr. (July 2, 1923 – July 7, 1988) was an American classical archaeologist and architectural historian.

Biography
He was born on July 2, 1923, in New York City to William Bell Dinsmoor and Zillah F. Pierce (1886–1960).

Dinsmoor studied at Phillips Exeter Academy and Columbia University, taking time out for active service in the military during World War II in India and China.  He received a B.A. in modern languages in 1947 and degrees in architecture: Bachelor’s (1947) and Master’s (1951) from Columbia University.  He married Mary Higgins on September 4, 1948.  That marriage produced four children: Margaret Park Dinsmoor, Diane Marie Dinsmoor, William Bell Dinsmoor III, and Robert Davidson Dinsmoor. In the 1950s, Dinsmoor worked as an architect in Colorado, New Mexico, and El Paso Texas. They divorced on January 7, 1966 in El Paso, Texas.  Dinsmoor moved to Greece to assist Lucy Taxis Shoe Meritt with her survey of Greek architectural moulding and Carl Blegen on his books on Troy and Pylos. He subsequently married Anastasia N. Dinsmoor. That marriage produced a son, Paul Dinsmoor. In the field, Dinsmoor worked with Oscar Broneer and helped publish the finds of the temple of Poseidon in Athens. In 1966 Dinsmoor was appointed architect for the archeological excavations of the Agora in Athens, a position which he held until his death. He received the Gold Medal Award for Distinguished Archaeological Achievement in 1969 from the Archaeological Institute of America.

Dinsmoor's main research focused on the propylaia to the acropolis in Athens, working to study its construction and establish its configuration during various phases. He died on  July 7, 1988, in Athens, Greece.

Dinsmoor's papers are archived in Athens at the American School of Classical Studies.

Selected works

Books
 1971. Sounion. ASIN : B00I4W3L7U 
 1980. The Propylaia to the Athenian Akropolis (Volume I, the Predecessors).  
 1984. Ancient Athenian Building Methods.  
 2004. The Propylaia to the Athenian Akropolis (Volume II, the Classical Building) (with William B. Dinsmoor, Sr., edited by Anastasia Norre Dinsmoor.

Articles
 1971. “New Parthenon Finds in the Agora,” Athens Annals of Archaeology, vol. 4. 
 1973. “The Kardaki Temple Re-Examined,” Mitteilungen des Deutschen Archäologischen Instituts Athenische Abteilung, vol. 88. 
 1974. “New Fragments of the Parthenon in the Athenian Agora,” Hesperia, vol. 43, No. 1. 
 1974. “The Monopteros in the Athenian Agora,” Hesperia, vol. 43, No. 4. 
 1974. “The Temple of Poseidon: A Missing Sima and Other Matters,” American Journal of Archaeology, vol. 78. 
 1975. “The Baptistery: Its Roofing and Related Problems,” Studies in the Antiquities of Stobi, vol. 2. 
 1976. “The Roof of the Hephaisteion,” American Journal of Archaeology, vol. 80. 
 1977. “The Archaeological Field Staff: The Architect,” Journal of Field Archaeology, vol. 4. 
 1982. “Anchoring Two Floating Temples,” Hesperia, vol. 51, No. 4. 
 1982. “The Asymmetry of the Pinakotheke for the Last Time?” Hesperia, supplement XX. 
 1984. “Preliminary Planning of the Propylaia by Mnesicles,” Le Dessin d’Architecture dans les Sociétés Antiques.

Book Reviews
 1971. “The Architects of the Parthenon, by Rhys Carpenter,” American Journal of Archaeology, vol. 75. 
 1977. “Wurster, Der Apollontempel,”  Gnomon, vol. 49.

Further reading
 The Propylaia to the Athenian Akropolis.  2 vols.  Princeton, NJ: American School of Classical Studies at Athens, 1980.
 John McKesson Camp Ancient Athenian Building Methods. Athens: American School of Classical Studies at Athens, 1984.
 American Journal of Archaeology 93 (April 1989): 233–4.
 American School of Classical Studies at Athens Newsletter no.22 (Fall1988):14.

References

1923 births
1988 deaths
Phillips Exeter Academy alumni
Columbia College (New York) alumni
20th-century American archaeologists
American expatriates in India
American expatriates in China
American military personnel of World War II
American architects
American expatriates in Greece